Ven Bogoda Seelawimala Nayaka Thera (Sinhala: පුජ්‍ය බෝගොඩ සීලවිමල නාහිමි) is the incumbent Head Priest of the London Buddhist Vihara and the current Chief Sangha Nayaka of Great Britain. He was appointed Chief Bhikkhu of the London Buddhist Vihara on 8 May 2008 following the demise of Ven Dr Medagama Vajiragnana Nayaka Thera. Ven Seelawimala Nayaka Thera hails from the Malwatte Chapter of the Siam Nikaya in Sri Lanka.

Early days
Hailing from Bogoda, a village in the Kurunegala District, Ven Seelawimala Nayaka Thera was the son of devout Buddhist parents. He entered the order at the age of 14 years under the tutorship of Ven Balalle Seelaratana Nayaka Thera (chief incumbent of Palagala Purana Vihara in Polgahawela and the chief Adhikarana Sangha Nayaka of Dambadeni-Harispattuwa. In 1964, he entered the Heramitigala Shastralankara Pirivena, Pilimatalawa for his primary education under the supervision of Ven Pilimatalawa Chandajothi Nayaka Thera.

Higher education
Ven Seelawimala Nayaka Thera graduated from the University of Sri Lanka (Peradeniya) in 1975. He had obtained an MA degree, studying under Professor Leslie Gunawardhana, on the subject: Influence of Hinduism on Buddhism. While at University, Seelawimala Nayaka Thera joined the teaching profession. He taught in several schools including Hindagala Maha Vidyalaya, Maliyadeva College, Kurunegala.
and Dharmaraja College, Kandy.

Having studied meditation under the meditation master Godwin Samararatne, Ven Seelawimala Nayaka Thera further trained under Ven Dr Henepola Gunaratana Nayaka Thera at his Meditation Centre in West Virginia.

Ven Seelawimala continues to engage in scholarly activities, engaging in international Buddhist conferences and contributing articles to Buddhist journals.

London Buddhist Vihara
In 1992, Ven Seelawimala Nayaka Thera joined the London Buddhist Vihara as a resident monk, on the invitation of Ven Dr Medagama Vajiragnana Nayaka Thera. Under the guidance and direction of Ven Dr Vajiragnana Nayaka Thera, and also Ven Professor Walpola Rahula Nayaka Thera (who was a regular visitor to the London Buddhist Vihara), Ven Seelawimala Thera developed as a Dhammaduta and proficient Dhamma communicator. Ven Seelawimala Nayaka Thera. also began teaching meditation in United Kingdom.

As well as serving as the Chief Bhikku of the London Buddhist Vihara, Ven Seelawimala Nayaka Thera serves as a trustee of the Inter-Faith Network UK, Director of the Heathrow Multi-Faith Chaplaincy Board, the Buddhist Chaplain of the West Middlesex University Hospital and at the Ealing Hospital. He is also the Chief of Sri Lankan Sangha Council in Britain, Buddhist representative at UK and Commonwealth Remembrance Day Ceremony and at the Commonwealth Day Ceremony at Cenotaph. Bogoda Seelawimala Nayaka Thera is the first Buddhist monk to be invited to a royal wedding in Britain and he attended to the Queens' diamond jubilee as well. It was in the St Paul's Cathedral on 5 June 2012.

National events 
The 2012 London Olympic organisers gave all participants at the games spiritual assistance in five of the major religions in the world. Followers of Christianity, Hinduism, Islam, Judaism and Buddhism were provided their own places of veneration and worship at the Olympic Village. As a result, Bogoda Seelawimala was appointed as Buddhist chaplain to the London Olympics.

Bogoda Seelawimala served as the sole Buddhist representative at the state funeral of Queen Elizabeth II at Westminster Abbey in 2022.

See also
London Buddhist Vihara

References

External links
London Buddhist Vihara, News Page
Venerable Bogoda Seelawimala the new Sangha Nayaka of Great Britain
Buddhism is thriving in Britain

Living people
Theravada Buddhist monks
Sri Lankan Buddhist monks
Sri Lankan Theravada Buddhists
Alumni of the University of Sri Lanka (Peradeniya)
English people of Sri Lankan descent
Sinhalese monks
Year of birth missing (living people)